Sechen Khan, born Buyan, (1556–1604) was a khagan of the Northern Yuan dynasty, reigning from 1592 to 1604. He was the eldest son of Jasaghtu Khan whom he succeeded.

Reign 
During Buyan Khan’s rule, the Northern Yuan dynasty once again fell into disarray. Although the Great Khan was recognized as the leader of all the Mongol tribes, this was in name only. Buyan Khan even attempted to show what was rumored to be the Imperial Seal of Genghis Khan to other Mongol clans to legitimatize his rule. He ruled the people in accordance with justice and religion. 

He died in 1604.

See also
 List of khans of the Northern Yuan dynasty

References

1550s births
1604 deaths
Northern Yuan rulers
16th-century Mongol rulers
17th-century Mongol rulers
16th-century Chinese monarchs
17th-century Chinese monarchs